Heather Jenner (real name Heather Lyon; born 1914, died 1991 ) was a matchmaker, who ran a marriage bureau, called "The Marriage Bureau",  in Bond Street, Mayfair, London.

The daughter of Cyril Arthur Lyon, an Army general, she married firstly, in 1942, Michael George Cox, and in 1955, the writer Stephen Potter. Widowed in 1969, she later married Sir John Hastings James, deputy master and Comptroller of the Royal Mint.

She established the agency in 1939, after her own divorce, and kept the business secret from her family and friends, using the name 'Heather Jenner', as such activity was considered scandalous at the time.

Her autobiography, Marriage is My Business, was published in 1954.

She appeared as a castaway on the BBC Radio programme Desert Island Discs on 31 July 1967.

Bibliography 

  (in French)

References 

1914 births
1991 deaths
Place of birth missing
Place of death missing
People from Mayfair
Matchmakers
Women autobiographers
English non-fiction writers
English autobiographers
Businesspeople from London
20th-century English businesspeople